Emlembe is the highest mountain in the African country of Eswatini. It is located in the east uKhahlamba (or Drakensberg) mountain range, on the border with South Africa. It is located in the South African province of Mpumalanga and the Swazi province of Hhohho.

References

External links
 

Mountains of Eswatini
Drakensberg
International mountains of Africa
Eswatini–South Africa border
Highest points of countries